The Wadsworth Electric Manufacturing Company was formed by George B. and Harry Wadsworth in 1904.  George received his first patent for an electrical service entrance safety switch in 1907.  This device reduced the likelihood of accident or fire and enabled homeowners  to replace  their own fuses.  He received an additional 15 patents in the field between 1907 and 1925.  Harry Wadsworth left the business in 1910.

Expansion
The company incorporated in 1918 and moved from an address on Madison Avenue to a Pike Street address.  By 1922, the company had grown to 100 employees and $1.5 million in sales.  That year, the company announced the construction of a new building on 11th Street, Covington, Kentucky.  The building was completed in March 1923.  In 1925, George Wadsworth sold his rights to 16 patents to a Cincinnati company and resigned from Wadsworth Electrical Manufacturing.   David Wadsworth, George's brother, was appointed vice president and chief engineer in 1927 and continued George's record of innovation until his death in 1937.

Personnel
Joseph Feltman, a local banker, was president of the company at the time of David Wadsworth's death.  He was succeeded by his son-in-law, Leo Kuhlman who continued as president until 1981.  The company was apparently successful during this period with employment reaching 300 during the 1950s.  Products included breaker boxes, fuses, wiring ducts, power outlets and other electrical devices.

Closure
Kuhlman was succeeded by his sons, John and Joseph, who ran the company until it was liquidated in December 1990.

References

National Register of Historic Places in Kenton County, Kentucky
Buildings and structures in Covington, Kentucky
Industrial buildings and structures on the National Register of Historic Places in Kentucky
Electrical wiring and construction supplies manufacturers
Electrical safety
Industrial buildings completed in 1923
Companies established in 1904
Defunct manufacturing companies based in Kentucky